Thembisile Hani Local Municipality is located in the Nkangala District Municipality of Mpumalanga province, South Africa. It is a semi-urban local Municipality consisting of 57 villages within which there are 5 (five) established townships.

The municipality is named after Thembisile Chris Hani, Secretary General of the South African Communist Party, who was assassinated on 10 April 1993.

Main places
The 2001 census divided the municipality into the following main places:

Politics 

The municipal council consists of sixty-four members elected by mixed-member proportional representation. Thirty-two are elected by first-past-the-post voting in thirty-two wards, while the remaining thirty-two are chosen from party lists so that the total number of party representatives is proportional to the number of votes received. In the election of 1 November 2021 the African National Congress (ANC) won a majority of forty seats on the council.

The following table shows the results of the election.

References

External links 
 Official homepage

Local municipalities of the Nkangala District Municipality